Soloveitchik (also Soloveichik) is a surname. The name is a diminutive form of the Russian word соловей, "nightingale", since the Soloveitchiks are a family of Levites, who are commanded by the Torah to sing in the Beit Hamikdash. It is notably the name of a rabbinic family descended from Yosef Dov Soloveitchik (Beis Halevi) (1820-1892). Members include:

 Ahron Soloveichik (1917–2001)
 Avraham Yehoshua Soloveitchik
 Bar Soloveychik (born 2000), Israeli swimmer
 Berel Soloveitchik (1915–1981) 
 Chaim Soloveitchik (1853–1918)
 Eliyahu Soloveitchik (Elijah Zevi) (1805–1881)
 Haym Soloveitchik (born 1937), American
 Joseph B. Soloveitchik (1903–1993), American Orthodox rabbi, Talmudist, and modern Jewish philosopher.
 Max Soloveichik (1883-1957), Lithuanian-Jewish Zionist activist, journalist, and a politician
 Meir Soloveichik (born 1977), American
 Moshe Soloveichik (1879–1941)
 Moshe Soloveitchik (Zurich) (1914-1995)
 Meshulam Dovid Soloveitchik (1921-2021)
 Peter Salovey (born 1958) (unlike the other names listed here, Salovey is not a descendant of Yosef Dov Soloveitchik, but rather of his uncle Eliyahu Zevi)
 Samuel Soloveichik (1909–1967)
 Yitzchok Zev Soloveitchik (1886–1959)
 Yosef Dov Soloveitchik (Beis Halevi)

Family tree

See also 
 Brisk tradition and Soloveitchik dynasty
Vorobeichik

External links
 TheRav.Net Resources on Rabbi Joseph B. Soloveitchik zt'l

 
Jewish families
Jewish surnames
Slavic-language surnames
Russian-language surnames
Levite surnames
Yiddish-language surnames